Elizabeth de Berkeley, Countess of Warwick and Baroness Lisle (1386 – 28 December 1422), was an English noblewoman and heiress. She was the only child of Thomas de Berkeley, 5th Baron Berkeley, and Margaret de Lisle, 3rd Baroness Lisle.

With her father's death in 1417, Elizabeth and her husband Richard de Beauchamp, 13th Earl of Warwick, became involved in an inheritance dispute with her cousin James Berkeley, initiating one of the longest lawsuits in English history.

Marriage and issue
Elizabeth de Berkeley was the only child born to Thomas de Berkeley, 5th Baron Berkeley, by his wife Margaret de Lisle, 3rd Baroness Lisle. As such, Elizabeth was their sole heir, and was to inherit the baronies of Lisle and Tyes from her mother. Margaret died near 1392, but Elizabeth did not succeed to them until the death of Thomas in 1417, as he held the lands by tenure of courtesy. In September 1392, Baron Berkeley negotiated Elizabeth's marriage to Richard de Beauchamp, eldest son and heir to Thomas de Beauchamp, 12th Earl of Warwick. Elizabeth married him sometime before 5 October 1397, and became the Countess of Warwick in 1403. The marriage remained unconsummated for at least six years. Elizabeth gave birth to three girls:
Lady Margaret Beauchamp (1404 – 1467/1468); married John Talbot, 1st Earl of Shrewsbury
Lady Eleanor Beauchamp (c. 1408 – 1467); married (1) Thomas de Ros, 8th Baron de Ros (2) Edmund Beaufort, 1st Duke of Somerset (3) Walter Rokesley
Lady Elizabeth Beauchamp (c. 1417 – died before 2 October 1480); married (1) George Neville, 1st Baron Latimer (2) Thomas Wake

Inheritance dispute

Elizabeth's level of education and literacy is evident from a 1410 commission asking John Walton to translate Boethius' De consolatione philosophiae; he dedicated it in her name.

An inheritance dispute erupted with her father's death in 1417. Thomas had named her his heir, but many of his lands and estates, including Berkeley Castle, were entailed through the male line to Elizabeth's cousin James Berkeley. Elizabeth and her husband refused to accept the entail, thus "initiat[ing] one of the longest lawsuits in England", which lasted until 1609.

After Lord Thomas' death, the Earl and Countess of Warwick quickly took control of the castle and gained the temporary permission of King Henry V to maintain it. James was unable to seize control of the castle, as Warwick and the king were then fighting in France. To gain support in the dispute, Elizabeth sought the help of John, Duke of Bedford while James successfully bribed Humphrey, Duke of Gloucester, each one of the king's brothers. By 1425, Elizabeth was dead and James had been given Berkeley Castle along with most of the entailed lands.

Elizabeth died on 28 December 1422. She was buried at Kingswood Abbey, and a marble tomb was later placed over her grave through a provision in her husband's will. The following year, the Earl of Warwick remarried to Lady Isabel le Despenser, the widow of his cousin Richard de Beauchamp, 1st Earl of Worcester.

Ancestry

References

Works cited

 
 

1386 births
1422 deaths
Elizabeth
Daughters of barons
English countesses
People from Berkeley, Gloucestershire
Barons Lisle (Peerage of England)
Wives of knights